Clichy may refer to:

In Paris Region, France 
 Canton of Clichy, an administrative division of the Hauts-de-Seine department, in northern France
 Clichy-sous-Bois, commune in the Seine-Saint-Denis département
 Clichy, Hauts-de-Seine, commune in the northwestern suburbs
 Boulevard de Clichy, famous street
 Place de Clichy, large square and traffic roundabout in the northwestern quadrant
 Porte de Clichy (Paris Métro and RER), station on Line 13 in the 17th arrondissement

Other 
 Club de Clichy, a political club during the French revolution
 Gaël Clichy (born 1985), French footballer

See also
 Quiet Days in Clichy (disambiguation)
 Cliché (disambiguation)